The 2009 Games of the Small States of Europe, also known as the XIIIth Games of the Small States of Europe were held in June 2009 among the participant nations in the Games of the Small States of Europe.  The opening ceremonies were on June 1, and the closing ceremonies on June 6.  The games were held in Cyprus, twenty years after the first Games held there in 1989. Malta was scheduled for 2009 in the rotation, but were selected to host the games early in 2003. The organizing committee estimates the cost at 1.5 million euros for all events.

Overview
The opening ceremony took place at the New GSP Stadium. A world premiere composed by David Foster was performed by tenor Mario Frangoulis on Monday 1 June 2009.
The principal sponsor of the event was Coca-Cola in a deal worth €140,000.

Participants
Participating countries were:
 
 
 
 
 
 
 
 

Montenegro, although eligible, did not participate. A record 1,500 athletes were expected to participate in the event.

Official logo and mascot

The official logo and the mascot, Tefkros the dove were revealed on the official website on May 14, 2008.

Events
Numbers in parentheses indicate the number of medal events contested in each sport.

Calendar

Venues
The majority of events (6 of 12) were held in venues in Nicosia. The southern city of Limassol hosted Beach Volleyball, Gymnastics, Sailing and Swimming, whilst the Mountain Bike events were held at the National Park of Machairas at an average altitude of 700m.
{| class="wikitable"
!
!Venues
!City/Locality
|-
|Athletics
|GSP Stadium
| Nicosia
|-
|Basketball
|Eleftheria Indoor Hall
|Nicosia
|-
|Beach Volley
|Sailing Centre
|Limassol
|-
|Cycling
|Mountain Bike Track
|Machairas
|-
|Gymnastics
|Palais de Sport
|Limassol
|-
|Judo
|Lefkotheo Indoor Hall
|Nicosia
|-
|Sailing
|Sailing Centre
|Limassol
|-
|Shooting
|Olympic Shooting Range
|Nicosia
|-
|Swimming
|Limassol Swimming Pool
|Limassol
|-
|Table Tennis
|Evangelos Florakis Indoor Hall
|Nicosia
|-
|Tennis
|National Tennis Centre
|Nicosia
|-
|Volleyball
|University of Cyprus Sports hall
|Nicosia
|-
|Opening and Closing ceremonies
|GSP Stadium
|Nicosia
|}

Media coverage
Lumiere TV and  the Cyprus Broadcasting Corporation covered the event. Live transmission through Hellas Sat of many events was covered in High Definition. Two daily summaries were also released.

Medal Count

Final Medal Table

References

External links
Official website

 
Games of the Small States of Europe
Games of the Small States of Europe
Games Of The Small States Of Europe, 2009
Games of the Small States of Europe
Games Of The Small States Of Europe
Multi-sport events in Cyprus
International sports competitions hosted by Cyprus